Kuntsevich or Kuntsevych is a Slavic surname that may refer to the following people:
Josaphat Kuntsevych (1580–1623), archbishop of the Ukrainian Greek Catholic Church
Vladimir Kuntsevich (born 1952), Russian high jumper 
Yawhen Kuntsevich (born 1988), Belarusian football player